The Oxford and Rugby Railway was promoted by the Great Western Railway as a means of connecting to the West Midlands and the north of England, by joining existing railways at Rugby. It was authorised in 1845, but the GWR soon decided to make its own line to Birmingham, and in 1846 it acquired the O&RR; work had not started on its construction. 
In the same year the GWR obtained Parliamentary authorisation for its Birmingham line. The two railways were treated as a single project, to connect Birmingham and Oxford. In 1850 a single line was opened between Oxford and Banbury, and in 1852 the whole line to Birmingham was opened.

The line continues in use at the present day, as an important trunk route.

Origin
In the mid-1840s the Great Western Railway had established its network in the south of England, but wished to connect northwards, to the industries of the West Midlands and the north-west of England.

It had reached Oxford on 12 June 1844 by means of an affiliated railway, the Oxford Railway, from Didcot. The Oxford terminus of that line was south of the River Thames, near Folly Bridge. At the time Rugby was a key railway centre, with lines radiating northward: the Midland Counties Railway and the London and Birmingham Railway connected there, forming the only routes to the north. If the GWR could reach Rugby, then it could secure the northern connections it desired.

Authorisation
Accordingly, the Oxford and Rugby Railway was promoted by the GWR. It would run from a junction with the Oxford Railway line south of Oxford, with a new, through, Oxford station nearer to the centre of the city, through Banbury and Fenny Compton to a junction with the London and Birmingham Railway at Rugby. The Oxford and Rugby Railway was given the Royal Assent on 4 August 1845. The GWR and the Oxford Railway were broad gauge lines, and the GWR naturally wished the O&RR to be the same, but Parliament inserted a requirement that mixed gauge must be provided if demanded by the Board of Trade.

Taken over by the GWR
By Act of 4 May 1846 the Oxford and Rugby Railway was taken over by the Great Western Railway.

Grand Junction Railway involvement
The Grand Junction Railway ran northwards from Birmingham to connect with the Liverpool and Manchester Railway, and now it sought a southward connection so as to extend its network. It connected with the London and Birmingham Railway, but found the L&BR a difficult business partner, and it wanted a line independent of the L&BR. The GWR naturally welcomed the GJR approach, which would bring it income from the GJR traffic.

The GJR was a narrow (standard) gauge railway; at this early stage in railway history, there was no certainty about a national track gauge, and the GJR stated that it would convert its existing network to the broad gauge so as to enable through running with the GWR. This may have been simply a negotiating tactic with the L&BR.
The GJR saw that the Oxford and Rugby Railway was in Parliament in the 1845 session, and the GJR altered its own proposal to join the Oxford and Rugby line at Knightcote, north of Fenny Compton, saving several miles of construction.
 
The necessity of building the line from Birmingham was based on the presumed impossibility of working with the London and Birmingham Railway, but very soon relations between the GJR and the L&BR normalised. The GJR saw that it could now make its London connections over the L&BR without building a new line, and it cancelled any commitment to the line to join the Oxford and Rugby Railway. The GJR and the L&BR, together with the Manchester and Birmingham Railway, amalgamated to form the London and North Western Railway on 16 July 1846.

Construction
The construction contract for the Oxford and Rugby Railway was let in the autumn of 1845, but there was considerable delay in getting possession of the land, and the contractor failed, and had to be replaced. The construction work was concentrated on the line as far as Fenny Compton, "at which point, it seems, the Directors had already decided to stop". Shortage of funds resulted in the progress of the work being very slow, and in 1849 "it had definitely been decided not to proceed farther than the point of junction with the Birmingham and Oxford [Junction] Railway, two miles beyond Fenny Compton, and to abandon the remaining  miles to Rugby, on which no work had been done".

Birmingham and Oxford Junction Railway

In the face of the Grand Junction Railway leaving the consortium to build from Birmingham, the GWR and the other parties interested in the line decided to proceed anyway, and the scheme became known as the Birmingham and Oxford Junction Railway. The London and Birmingham Railway (and its successor the LNWR) resorted to a series of spoiling tactics in Parliament intended to undermine the case for the line, but after a considerable struggle, the Royal Assent was given to the Birmingham and Oxford Junction Railway on 3 August 1846.

A single project
As the Oxford and Rugby Railway had already been incorporated into the GWR, the whole scheme – Oxford and Rugby Railway (to Fenny Compton) and Birmingham and Oxford Junction Railway was treated as a single GWR project, to build the Birmingham and Oxford line.

Partial opening
As construction proceeded the company decided to open a single line from Oxford to Banbury on the broad gauge, but the London and North Western Railway demanded that mixed gauge be provided, as laid down in the O&RR's authorising Act, even though at this stage there was no prospect of running narrow (standard) gauge trains. After considerable deliberation by the Board of Trade Commissioners, the line was opened to Banbury on 2 September 1850 as a broad gauge single line.

Opening, and the present
Construction continued, and the line was opened throughout in 1852.

At the present day the Oxford and Rugby Railway section is a part of the Oxford to Birmingham line, an important main line.

References

Banbury
Early British railway companies
Great Western Railway constituents
History of Oxford
History of Oxfordshire
History of Warwickshire
Railway companies established in 1845
Rail transport in Oxfordshire
Rail transport in Warwickshire
Railway lines opened in 1850
Rugby, Warwickshire
Transport in Oxford